FDP.The Liberals is a liberal political party in Switzerland. It is tied for the largest party in the Federal Council, is the third-largest party in the National Council and is the second-largest in the Council of States.

The party was formed on 1 January 2009, after two parties, the Free Democratic Party (FDP/PRD) and the smaller Liberal Party (LPS/PLS), united. In Vaud and Valais, the parties retain separate organisations. Its youth organisation is Young Liberals. With 120,000 members as of 2015, the FDP has the most members of any party: 20% more than the second-placed Christian Democratic People's Party of Switzerland (CVP/PDC).

The party is a member of the Alliance of Liberals and Democrats for Europe Party (ALDE) and an observer member of the Liberal International. The party's president is Petra Gössi. The current FDP representatives in the Federal Council are Ignazio Cassis and Karin Keller-Sutter.

History
The party was formed in 2009 from the merger of the Free Democratic Party (FDP) and the Liberal Party. The radical Free Democratic Party, also called the 'Radicals', was Switzerland's major establishment party. Founded in 1894, the party's classical liberal predecessors had governed Switzerland outright for most of the 19th century, and had been the guiding force behind the creation of modern Switzerland. The Liberal Party, known as the 'Old Liberals', represented the French-speaking establishment: again rooted in the conservative liberalism of the nineteenth century. It also had a distinctly liberal Protestant outlook.

In the 2003 federal election, the two parties formed an electoral alliance. In the election, the Liberals were reduced to four seats, below the five required to form an official grouping in the Federal Assembly, so the two formed a joint caucus. In June 2005, the two founded the Radical and Liberal Union, which aimed to promote liberal goals through deeper cooperation. In 2007, the women's arms of the parties merged, while the youth wings merged the following year to form the Young Liberals. Agreement on the merger of the federal parties was agreed in October 2008. The agreement was adopted on 28 February 2009, applying retroactively to 1 January 2009. FDP President Fulvio Pelli of Ticino became the party's first leader, while Liberal President Pierre Weiss was named one of four Vice-Presidents.

Separate Free Democrat and Liberal branches remained in competition with each other in Geneva, Valais, and Vaud. In May 2011, the party's two Geneva branches – Liberal Party of Geneva and Radical Party of Geneva – merged to form a single FDP.The Liberals cantonal branch. In the 2015 federal election, the FDP increased its share of the popular vote by 1.3%, the first time it had increased since the 1979 federal election.

Positions

As a classically liberal party, the FDP wants to protect civil liberties and individual responsibility. The FDP calls for mutual tolerance of people with different opinions and self-identities, entrepreneurship, social responsibility, the rule of law, and participatory democracy.

The party supports neutrality, federalism, direct democracy, and the tax sovereignty of each canton. It believes that national security should be credibly guaranteed by a skilled and strong militia. The party is for a "cosmopolitan Switzerland", which benefits from the opportunities that globalization provides. The FDP supports the close cooperation with the EU through bilateral treaties, but rejects accession to the EU. The immigration policy of the party is based on the integration of immigrants, requiring clear and effective rules by means of an "integration law". The FDP calls for consistent action against abuse of laws in Switzerland by immigrants, and in repeated cases calls for deporting foreign criminals in accordance with international law. The FDP supports a peaceful foreign policy, which increases the security of Switzerland and prevents an increasing number of refugees.

Economic policy
The party believes that an open society and economic freedom are more conducive to prosperity, and greater economic and social stability, rather than a redistributive and regulative state. The FDP wants more freedom of choice rather than restrictions in all areas of private life. According to the party's stance, self-responsibility and competition should dictate the actions of individuals, rather than bans. The FDP wants to ensure that personal initiative is rewarded and not restricted by paternalism. Start-ups, particularly by young people, are to be encouraged.

The party stands for a simple tax code, low taxes, and for tax competition among the cantons. It calls for a more citizen-friendly state without excessive bureaucracy and excessive regulation, and for a lean state with lower government spending, which offers only those services which citizens and the private sector cannot provide. The party, which calls for a competitive and sustainable market economy, wants to strengthen Switzerland as a financial and economic hub with as little government interference as possible. It also calls for the reduction of public debt and fiscal deficits. In general, it believes that tax incentives are better than subsidies in creating incentives. The party saw opportunity in the 2007-2010 financial crisis an to carry out financial and tax reforms quickly to improve the situation of companies in Switzerland, and to create 40,000 new jobs by 2015. The main objectives of energy policy are security of energy supply and increasing energy efficiency. The party wants to support the research of alternative sources of energy for electricity production which generate no carbon dioxide.

Social policy
The FDP works toward a society offering genuine opportunities with flexible choices in education, work and family support. It is also aiming at more and better jobs, a sustainable social welfare system which will result in strong national cohesion that counteracts see the divergence of society. This includes stabilizing premium costs in the healthcare sector and combating the abuse of social welfare systems, but also intergenerational equity. The motto of the party in matters of social security is: "Solidarity where it is necessary" and "self-reliance where it is possible". As a profitable investment for the future of society, the FDP wants to promote the highest quality education at all levels, since it considers human capital the most important resource of Switzerland. It considers innovation as a crucial asset for prosperity and wants to improve the position of Switzerland as one of the leaders of innovation.

The party is, in principle, in favour of ending marijuana prohibition to encourage safe and legal free enterprise as opposed to a costly war on drugs, emphasizing personal and family responsibility over life choices, as opposed to making such choices a state power. However, many in the party may not be in favour of a full legalization, such as in the U.S. state of Colorado, but just decriminalisation such as the approach in Portugal.

Foreign policy
The FDP opposes Swiss membership in the European Union, saying that Switzerland can only remain a world leader if it remains outside the EU. It strongly supports the bilateral accords that Switzerland has with the EU, however. In the 2001 referendum, the FDP campaigned against opening negotiations to join the EU. The FDP believes that international law takes precedence over Swiss law, although it states that Swiss voters should approve international law before it takes effect.

Election results

National Council

Party strength over time

a.* indicates that the party was not on the ballot in this canton.
b.Part of the Canton of Bern until 1979.
c.In Basel Stadt the FDP and Liberals (LP) were not merged in 2011, 2015 and 2019, numbers are for the FDP party.
d.In Vaud the FDP and Liberals (LP) were not merged in 2011, numbers are for the FDP party.

Leaders
 Fulvio Pelli (2009–2012), Ticino
 Philipp Müller (2012–2016), Aargau
 Petra Gössi (2016–present), Schwyz

See also
 Liberalism and radicalism in Switzerland

Notes and references

External links 
 
FDP. The Liberals in History of Social Security in Switzerland

 
Classical liberal parties
Liberal International
Radical parties
Non-interventionist parties
Political parties established in 2009
Alliance of Liberals and Democrats for Europe Party member parties
2009 establishments in Switzerland